Delor may refer to:

Davina Delor (born 1952), French dancer and Buddhist nun
Delor, a brand name of polychlorinated biphenyl

See also

Jacques Delors (born 1925), President of the European Commission 1985–1995